Castelo de Pirescoxe is a castle in Portugal. It is part of Loures, Grande Lisboa Subregion.

It is classified by IGESPAR as a site of public interest.

Castles in Portugal